The 2011 Italian GP2 Series round was a GP2 Series motor race held on September 10 and 11, 2011 at Autodromo Nazionale Monza, Italy. It was the ninth round of the 2011 GP2 season. The race supported the 2011 Italian Grand Prix. This was the season finale of the season for series, but GP2 will race a non-championship round in Abu Dhabi.

After Romain Grosjean clinched Drivers' Championship in the previous round, the contest for the Teams' title continued as Barwa Addax was only 8 points ahead DAMS in the standings, but the Spanish team won the title after the last race.

Classification

Qualifying

Feature Race

Sprint Race

Notes
 – Herck was due to start from last grid position after being handed a ten grid position penalty for causing a collision during Feature Race, but did not take the start because of a hand injury sustained in the collision.

Final standings

Drivers' Championship standings

Teams' Championship standings

 Note: Only the top five positions are included for both sets of standings.

See also 
 2011 Italian Grand Prix
 2011 Monza GP3 Series round

References

External links
GP2 Series official website: Results

Monza
Monza